The Women of Honor World Championship was a women's professional wrestling championship created and promoted by the American professional wrestling promotion Ring of Honor (ROH).

History
At Final Battle, December 15, 2017, it was announced that a tournament to crown the first Women of Honor Championship would start on January 20, 2018. The tournament featured ROH regulars, called the ROH Women of Honor and wrestlers from ROH partner promotion World Wonder Ring Stardom (Stardom) as well.

On April 7, 2018 Sumie Sakai became the inaugural champion by defeating Kelly Klein in the 16-women tournament finals at Supercard of Honor XII in New Orleans, LA. During her reign, the title was renamed to Women of Honor World Championship at the Ring of Honor Wrestling tapings on August 25, 2018.

During Kelly Klein's third reign, ROH producer Joey Mercury left the promotion. In a series of tweets, Mercury said ROH doesn't have a concussion protocol and Klein had to wrestle while injured. Klein agreed with Mercury and ROH let her go after her contract expired on December 31. Two months later, the creation of a new title was announced, the ROH Women's World Championship.

Since coming into existence, the Women of Honor World Championship has been defended at Stardom events in addition to ROH shows, pay-per-views, and events.

Inaugural championship tournament (2017–2018)

Qualifying matches
 Ring of Honor Wrestling tapings – June 29 and June 30 (2300 Arena – Philadelphia, Pennsylvania)

Tournament bracket

Reigns

Names

Reigns

Combined reigns

See also
World Women's Championship (disambiguation)

References

External links

ROH Women of Honor World Championship at Cagematch.net

Ring of Honor championships
Women's professional wrestling championships